Melhania polygama is a plant in the mallow family Malvaceae, native to South Africa.

Description
Uniquely within the genus Melhania, the flowers are polygamous.

Distribution and habitat
Melhania polygama is known only from Hluhluwe–Imfolozi Park (formerly Umfolozi Game
Reserve) in KwaZulu-Natal. Its habitat is on grassy hill slopes.

References

polygama
Flora of KwaZulu-Natal
Plants described in 1964